The Aa of Weerijs is a river in Belgium, where it arises from the confluence of the Great Aa (in Wuustwezel) and the Small Aa (in Brecht). In Breda (which means the broad Aa) it is the river in the canals of this city. The name Broad Aa is a reference to its confluence with the Upper Mark. The conjoined rivers continue flowing as the Mark. The width of the Aa of Weerijs varies from 5 meters to the border with Belgium up to 15 meters in Breda. The valley is about 3 kilometers wide.

References

Rivers of the Netherlands
Rivers of Belgium
Rivers of Flemish Brabant
Rivers of Antwerp Province
2Aaofweerijs